Steiners Corner is a ghost town in Lincoln Township, Morrow County, in the U.S. state of Ohio.

History
The town was named for William Steiner, a pioneer settler.  Steiner "built his cabin on the Sunbury road, a little south of where the Cardington and Chesterville pike crosses this road".

References

Geography of Morrow County, Ohio
Ghost towns in Ohio